Calm Down may refer to:
Calm Down (EP), 2014 EP by Alison Wonderland
"Calm Down" (Killing Heidi song), 2004
"Calm Down" (Busta Rhymes song), 2014
Calm Down (Rema song), 2022
"Calm Down", a 2013 song by The Love Language from Ruby Red
"Calm Down", a 2015 song by G-Eazy from When It's Dark Out
Calm Down, a character and episode from the animated series Stoppit and Tidyup
You Need to Calm Down, a 2017 song by Taylor Swift from her 7th studio album Lover